The 1974 Tampa Spartans football team represented the University of Tampa in the 1974 NCAA Division I football season. It was the Spartans' 38th season and they competed as an NCAA Division I independent. The team was led by head coach Dennis Fryzel, in his second year, and played their home games at Tampa Stadium in Tampa, Florida. They finished with a record of six wins and five losses (6–5). On February 27, 1975, the University of Tampa Board of Trustees voted to disband the Spartans football program effective for the 1975 season. Financial hardship was cited as the primary reason for its being disbanded.

Schedule

References

Tampa
Tampa Spartans football seasons
Tampa Spartans football